Areca is a genus of 51 species of palms in the family Arecaceae, found in humid tropical forests from the islands of the Philippines, Malaysia and India, across Southeast Asia to Melanesia. The generic name Areca is derived from a name used locally on the Malabar Coast of India.

Usage

The best-known member of the genus is A. catechu, the areca nut palm. Several species of areca nuts, known for their bitter and tangy taste, raw or dried, are routinely used for chewing, especially in combination with the leaves of betel and dried leaves of tobacco. Areca nut is also popularly referred to as betel nut because of its usage for chewing with betel leaves. In Assam, areca nut is also known as tamul in the local dialect.

Species 

(51 species)
Areca abdulrahmanii J.Dransf.
Areca ahmadii J.Dransf.
Areca andersonii J.Dransf.
Areca gandamatu Sultan Mardan Plantation
Areca arundinacea Becc.
Areca brachypoda J.Dransf.
Areca caliso Becc.
Areca camarinensis Becc.
Areca catechu L.
Areca celebica Burret
Areca chaiana J.Dransf.
Areca concinna Thwaites
Areca congesta Becc.
Areca costulata Becc.
Areca dayung J.Dransf.
Areca furcata Becc.
Areca glandiformis Lam.
Areca guppyana Becc.
Areca gurita Heatubun
Areca hutchinsoniana Becc.
Areca insignis (Becc.) J.Dransf.
Areca ipot Becc.
Areca jobiensis Becc.
Areca jugahpunya J.Dransf.
Areca kinabaluensis Furtado
Areca klingkangensis J.Dransf.
Areca laosensis Becc.
Areca ledermanniana Becc.
Areca macrocalyx Zipp. ex Blume
Areca macrocarpa Becc.
Areca minuta Scheff.
Areca montana Ridl.
Areca multifida Burret
Areca nannospadix Burret
Areca nigasolu Becc.
Areca novohibernica (Lauterb.) Becc.
Areca oxycarpa Miq.
Areca parens Becc.
Areca rechingeriana Becc.
Areca rheophytica J.Dransf.
Areca ridleyana Becc. ex Furtado
Areca rostrata Burret
Areca salomonensis Burret
Areca subacaulis (Becc.) J.Dransf.
Areca torulo Becc.
Areca triandra Roxb. ex Buch.-Ham.
Areca tunku J.Dransf. & C.K.Lim
Areca vestiaria Giseke
Areca vidaliana Becc.
Areca warburgiana Becc.
Areca whitfordii Becc.

See also

Dypsis lutescens, a plant also sometimes referred to as "Areca palm"

References

 
Arecaceae genera
Taxa named by Carl Linnaeus